Dacia: An Outline of the Early Civilization of the Carpatho-Danubian Countries is a history book by the Romanian historian and archaeologist Vasile Pârvan (1882 – 1927). The book, published post-mortem in 1928, resulted from a series of lectures that Pârvan gave  at Cambridge University. Similar, to his major work, Getica (1926), Dacia covers the ancient history of Carpatho-Danubian region. In both books, Pârvan presented Dacia as a great kingdom with a homogeneous ethnic base, an advanced civilization and a well-defined political and national identity.

See also
 Dacia
 Vasile Pârvan

Notes

References 

 
 

Books by Vasile Pârvan
Books about Dacia